The 1958 South American Championships in Athletics were held in Montevideo, Uruguay, between 19 and 27 April.

Medal summary

Men's events

Women's events

Medal table

External links
 Men Results – GBR Athletics
 Women Results – GBR Athletics
 Medallists

S
South American Championships in Athletics
1958 in South American sport
International athletics competitions hosted by Uruguay
1958 in Uruguayan sport